Kenjeje (or Kendeje) is a Maban language of Chad. The two dialects, Yaali and Faranga, are quite distinct, and have little contact.

References

Maban languages
Languages of Chad